The Creswell Mansion, recently renamed the Marijuana Mansion, is a historic mansion located at 1244 Grant Street in Denver, Colorado. It was designed in 1889 by leading Denver architect John J. Huddart. In 1977, it was added to the National Register of Historic Places.

Architecture 

The exterior, constructed of red sandstone, combines elements of the Richardsonian Romanesque and Queen Anne styles. At the time it was built, the mansion enjoyed a view of the Front Range of the Rocky Mountains. Today, however, the view is obstructed by modern buildings.

History 

The mansion was designed by revered Denver architect John J. Huddart in 1889 for businessman Joseph Creswell and his family. It was added to the National Register on November 25, 1977. Huddart designed a number of other buildings listed on the National Register.

The building received the nickname “Marijuana Mansion” due to its connection with Colorado Amendment 64, which legalized the recreational use of marijuana. Vicente Sederberg LLP, a national cannabis law firm, moved their offices into the mansion shortly after voters approved the Amendment 64 proposal, which they had participated in writing. When Amendment 64 was passed in 2012, the Task Force on the Implementation of Amendment 64 was established, and Vicente Sederberg LLP was included in this task force. The mansion was also occupied at the same time by the National Cannabis Industry Association, who established it as the Colorado headquarters for the Marijuana Project. The mansion was purchased by its current owner in September 2019, and today, it is promoted as a marijuana-themed private event venue, with the accompanying carriage house serving as a dispensary.

References 

Houses on the National Register of Historic Places in Colorado
Queen Anne architecture in Colorado
Houses completed in 1889
Houses in Denver
National Register of Historic Places in Denver
Richardsonian Romanesque architecture in Colorado